Icriodus is an extinct conodont genus in the family Gnathodontidae.

In 1938, Edward Branson and Maurice Mehl reviewed the conodont genus Icriodus.

References

External links 

 
 

Ozarkodinida genera
Devonian conodonts
Paleozoic life of Ontario
Paleozoic life of the Northwest Territories
Paleozoic life of Nunavut
Paleozoic life of Yukon